The large Mindanao roundleaf bat (Hipposideros coronatus) is a species of bat in the family Hipposideridae endemic to the Philippines.

References

Hipposideros
Mammals of the Philippines
Mammals described in 1871
Endemic fauna of the Philippines
Fauna of Mindanao
Taxa named by Wilhelm Peters
Taxonomy articles created by Polbot
Bats of Southeast Asia